John McManus is the name of:
 J. P. McManus (born 1951), Irish businessman and racehorse owner
 John C. McManus (born 1965), American military historian and author
 John McManus (New Zealand politician) (1875–1950), New Zealand politician, trade unionist and farmer
 John McManus (author), American novelist
 John McManus (diplomat), former British Ambassador to Guinea
 John T. McManus (1904–1961), American journalist and progressive politician
 Red McManus (1925–2013), American college basketball coach
 Rove McManus (born 1974), Australian television identity